Bella Sidney Woolf OBE (1877–1960) was an English author, sister of author Leonard Woolf and first married to Robert Heath Lock, and in her second marriage to Hong Kong colonial secretary and colonial Ceylonese administrator Tom Southorn.

Early life
Woolf was born in London, the eldest (or 2nd eldest) of ten children to Marie (née de Jongh) and a Jewish barrister Solomon Rees Sydney Woolf. Her father died in 1892.

At the end of 1907 she travelled to Ceylon to visit her brother, Leonard Woolf, then a junior civil servant stationed in Kandy.

First marriage

In the following months she met Robert Heath Lock, Assistant Director of the Peradeniya Botanical Gardens, near Kandy. They were married in 1910. In August 1908, she went back to England with her brother, who was returning briefly before taking up a promotion as Assistant Government Agent of Hambantota. Robert Heath Lock died in 1915.

Second marriage
In 1921, aged around 44, she remarried, to Tom Southorn, whom she met in Ceylon through Leonard. In 1904 as a junior civil servant, Tom had met Leonard off the boat on his arrival in Ceylon. He served a long period in colonial service in Ceylon and rose to be colonial secretary of Hong Kong, Acting Administrator of Hong Kong on various occasions, and Governor of the Gambia.

From this time she sometimes went by the name Bella Woolf Southorn, and occasionally used Bella Sidney Southorn. But she continued to publish as Bella Sidney Woolf.

She greatly enjoyed her life as the wife of a colonial civil servant and was fascinated by all the places she lived, which informed her writing, both fiction and what we would now call 'tourist guides'.

During her years in Hong Kong she was active in community work and was commissioner of the Girl Guides from 1926 to 1936. In 1935 she was appointed an OBE.

Author
Woolf wrote fiction and non-fiction. In both she drew on her experiences in her husbands' various colonial postings – to write stories and to write guides to the localities, customs and people. She also authored and co-authored on current events and science

Her How To See Ceylon was published in 1914, and incorporating her experience of car journeys with her husband "along the sunny roads of Ceylon" is considered the first pocket guidebook to the island. Three more editions followed in 1922, 1924 and 1929.

While Tom was Governor of the Gambia, from 1936, she wrote a detailed history of the tiny West African territory.

Her approach was quite liberal for the day. She saw value in the cultures that the British Empire embraced and was concerned at what she perceived as their erosion. "It is unfortunate that so many natives are adopting English dress, blind to the fact that it destroys all their individuality and Oriental grace", she wrote, of Ceylon, and "Kandyan divorce laws are so enlightened that....".

Her short propagandist booklet Right against might; the great war of 1914, published in 1914, has been reprinted by the original publisher in modern times.

Much of Woolf's fictional writing was short stories drawn from her life as the wife of two colonial civil servants. Some of these were later compiled as Bits of Old China and Under the Mosquito Curtain.

Woolf also wrote several children's books, all drawing on her various overseas experiences; The Twins in Ceylon and its sequels were very popular.

Works
 Jerry & Joe, A Tale of Two Jubilees (Oliphant, Anderson & Ferrier, Edinburgh, 1897)
 All in a Castle Fair (Cassell, New York, 1900)
 Dear Sweet Anne or The Mysterious Veres (Collins, probably 1900–1910)
 Golden House (Duckworth and Co., c1910)^
 The Twins in Ceylon (Duckworth and Co., London, 1909, 1913) and sequels
 How To See Ceylon (1st Ed: Visidunu Prakashakayo, 1914; 2nd Ed: Times of Ceylon Co, 1922;  4th Ed: Times of Ceylon Co, 1929)
 Right against might; the great war of 1914 (Cambridge, W. Heffer, 1914) (Reprinted: Pranava Books, 2009)
 Eastern Star-Dust (Times of Ceylon, Colombo, 1922)
 The Strange Little Girl (Thomas Nelson and Sons, London c1923)^
 Little Miss Prue
 Chips of China (Kelly and Walsh Ltd, Shanghai, 1930)
 From Groves of Palm (W. Heffer & Sons Ltd, Cambridge, 1925)^^
 Bits of Old China and Under the Mosquito Curtain

^ sometimes credited to 'Woolf, Bella Sidney (Mrs. R. H. Lock)'
^^ credited to 'Woolf, Bella Sidney (Mrs. W. T. Southorn)'

Co-authored
 Recent Progress in the Study of Variation, Heredity, and Evolution, (Robert Heath Lock, Leonard Doncaster, Bella Sidney Woolf) (Pranava Books, 1916. Reprinted Pranava Books, 2009)
 Little Folks – The Magazine for Boys and Girls Volume 84 [1916], Geoffrey H. White. Eveline M. Williams. D. H. Parry. Nancy M. Hayes. Walter Copeland. Bella Sidney Woolf. Squirrel. et al. (Cassell and Co. Ltd, London, 1916)

References

External links 

English Jews
English memoirists
British Jewish writers
1877 births
1960 deaths
Sri Lankan Jews
Sri Lankan people of English descent
British women memoirists
British women short story writers
English short story writers
English children's writers